Decade is a compilation album by Canadian-American musician Neil Young, originally released in 1977 as a triple album and later issued on two compact discs. It contains 35 of Young's songs recorded between 1966 and 1976, among them five tracks that had been unreleased up to that point. It peaked at No. 43 on the Billboard Top Pop Albums chart, and was certified platinum by the RIAA in 1986.

History
Compiled by Young himself, with his hand-written liner notes about each track, Decade represents almost every album from his career and various affiliations through 1977 with the exception of 4 Way Street and Time Fades Away. Of the previously unreleased songs, "Down to the Wire" features the New Orleans pianist Dr. John with Buffalo Springfield on an item from their shelved Stampede album; "Love Is a Rose" was a minor hit for Linda Ronstadt in 1975; "Winterlong" received a cover by Pixies on the Neil Young tribute album from 1989, The Bridge; and "Campaigner" is a Young song critical of Richard Nixon.  The track "Long May You Run" is a different mix to that found on the album of the same name, featuring the harmonies of the full Crosby Stills & Nash before David Crosby and Graham Nash left the recording sessions.

For many years, Decade was the only Neil Young compilation album available. A 1993 compilation called Lucky Thirteen was released, but it only covered Young's 1982–1988 output. It was not until 2004 that Reprise Records released a single-disc retrospective of his best-known tracks, titled Greatest Hits. Throughout the 1980s and '90s, Young promised fans a follow-up to the original Decade collection, provisionally titled Decade II; eventually, this idea was scrapped in favor of a much more comprehensive anthology to be titled Archives, spanning his entire career and ranging in size from a box set to an entire series of audio and/or video releases. The first release of archival material since Decade and Lucky Thirteen would appear in 2006, Live at the Fillmore East, a recording from a 1970 concert featuring Crazy Horse with Danny Whitten. Several other archival live releases followed, and in 2009 the first of several planned multi-disc box sets, The Archives Vol. 1 1963–1972, was issued. In April 2017 Decade was reissued on vinyl as a limited-edition Record Store Day release, with remastered vinyl and CD editions planned for general release in June 2017.

Alternate early version
Initially, Decade was to be released in 1976, but was pulled at the last minute by Young.  It was shelved until the following year, where it appeared with two songs removed from the original track list (a live version of "Don't Cry No Tears" recorded in Japan in 1976, and a live version of "Pushed It Over the End" recorded in 1974). Also removed were the following comments on those two songs and Time Fades Away, from Young's handwritten liner notes:

Reception

The album has been lauded in many quarters as one of the best examples of a career retrospective for a rock artist, and as a template for the box set collections that would follow in the 1980s and beyond. However, in the original article on Young from the first edition of the Rolling Stone Illustrated History of Rock and Roll and a subsequent article in the 1983 Rolling Stone Record Guide, critic Dave Marsh used this album to accuse Young of deliberately manufacturing a self-mythology, arguing that while his highlights could be seen to place him on a level with other artists from his generation like Bob Dylan or The Beatles, the particulars of his catalogue did not bear this out. The magazine has since excised the article from subsequent editions of the Illustrated History book.

Track listing
All songs written by Neil Young.

Side one
"Down to the Wire" – 2:25
Previously unreleased (1967); performed with Buffalo Springfield members Stephen Stills and Richie Furay along with Dr. John; planned for inclusion on the unreleased album Stampede
"Burned" – 2:14
Performed by Buffalo Springfield; appears on the album Buffalo Springfield (1966)
"Mr. Soul" – 2:41
Performed by Buffalo Springfield; recorded live in the studio in New York City, New York, with guitar overdubs added subsequently; appears on the album Buffalo Springfield Again (1967)
"Broken Arrow" – 6:13
Performed by Buffalo Springfield; appears on the album Buffalo Springfield Again
"Expecting to Fly" – 3:44
Appears on the album Buffalo Springfield Again but no band member other than Neil Young appears on the track.
"Sugar Mountain" – 5:43
Recorded live in concert on November 10, 1968, at the Canterbury House, Ann Arbor, Michigan; released as the B-side to "The Loner", February 21, 1969

Side two
"I Am a Child" – 2:17
Appears on the Buffalo Springfield album Last Time Around (1968) but features no members of the band other than Neil Young and drummer Dewey Martin
"The Loner" – 3:50
Appears on the album Neil Young (1968)
"The Old Laughing Lady" – 5:59/5:35**
Appears on the album Neil Young (** – Edited version on 1990 CD reissue)
"Cinnamon Girl" – 2:59
Performed by Neil Young & Crazy Horse; appears on the album Everybody Knows This Is Nowhere (1969)
"Down by the River" – 9:16/9:00**
Performed by Neil Young & Crazy Horse; appears on the album Everybody Knows This Is Nowhere

Side three
"Cowgirl in the Sand" – 10:01
Performed by Neil Young & Crazy Horse; appears on the album Everybody Knows This Is Nowhere
"I Believe in You" – 3:27
Performed by Neil Young & Crazy Horse; appears on the album After the Gold Rush (1970)
"After the Gold Rush" – 3:45
Appears on the album After the Gold Rush
"Southern Man" – 5:31
Appears on the album After the Gold Rush
"Helpless" – 3:34
Performed by Crosby, Stills, Nash & Young; appears on the album Déjà Vu (1970)

Side four
"Ohio" – 2:56
Performed by Crosby, Stills, Nash & Young; released as a non-album single in June, 1970 and later appeared on So Far, 1974
"Soldier" – 2:28
Edited version originally from the album Journey Through the Past (1972)
"Old Man" – 3:21
Appears on the album Harvest (1972)
"A Man Needs a Maid" – 3:58
Appears on the album Harvest
"Harvest" – 3:08
Appears on the album Harvest 
"Heart of Gold" – 3:06
Appears on the album Harvest
"Star of Bethlehem" – 2:46
Appears on the album American Stars 'n Bars (1977); originally recorded in November 1974

Side five
"The Needle and the Damage Done" – 2:02
Recorded live in concert on January 30, 1971, at the Royce Hall, University of California, Westwood, Los Angeles, California; appears on the album Harvest
"Tonight's the Night" (Part 1) – 4:41
Appears on the album Tonight's the Night (1975); originally recorded in 1973
"Tired Eyes" – 4:33
Appears on the album Tonight's the Night
"Walk On" – 2:40
Appears on the album On the Beach (1974)
"For the Turnstiles" – 3:01
Appears on the album On the Beach
"Winterlong" – 3:05
Previously unreleased; recorded in November 1973 and appeared on certain acetate pressings of Tonight's the Night
"Deep Forbidden Lake" – 3:39
Previously unreleased

Side six
"Like a Hurricane" – 8:16
Performed by Neil Young & Crazy Horse; previously unreleased (but originally recorded in November 1975); different lead vocal dub from version on American Stars 'n Bars (Regular version on 1990 reissue CD)
"Love Is a Rose" – 2:16
Previously unreleased; later released on Homegrown (2020) 
"Cortez the Killer" – 7:29
Performed by Neil Young & Crazy Horse; appears on the album Zuma (1975)
"Campaigner" – 3:30 / 4:19 [US LP test pressings and first LP pressings in Germany included an unedited 4:19 version with an extra verse]
Previously unreleased; unedited version later released on Hitchhiker (2017)
"Long May You Run" – 3:48
Performed by Crosby, Stills, Nash & Young; previously unreleased; original mix (without Crosby and Nash's vocals) appears on the Stills-Young Band album Long May You Run (1976)

Personnel

Elliot Mazer – Producer
David Briggs – Producer
Neil Young – Guitar, harmonica, piano, vibes, vocals

Charts

Certifications

Notes

Neil Young compilation albums
Reprise Records compilation albums
Albums produced by Neil Young
Albums produced by David Briggs (producer)
Albums produced by Elliot Mazer